Jefferson Smurfit may refer to:

 Smurfit Kappa, a European corrugated packaging company
 Smurfit-Stone Container, an American-based paperboard and paper-based packaging company